The 2014 San Jose mayoral election was held on June 3, 2014 to elect the Mayor of San Jose, California. Councilmember Sam Liccardo defeated Santa Clara County Supervisor Dave Cortese in a runoff on November 4, 2014.

Incumbent Democratic Mayor Chuck Reed was term limited and could not run for re-election to a third consecutive term in office.

The election is nonpartisan per California state law, although most of the candidates chose to state a political party affiliation. A primary election was held on June 3, 2014. As no candidate received a majority of the vote, a runoff election was held between the top two vote-getters, Dave Cortese and Sam Liccardo, on November 4, 2014. Liccardo was elected mayor with a majority of the vote.

Municipal elections in California are officially non-partisan.

Candidates

Declared
 Michael Alvarado
 Bill Chew, perennial candidate
 Dave Cortese, Santa Clara County Supervisor, former San Jose City Councilman and candidate for Mayor in 2006
 Timothy Harrison
 Rose Herrera, San Jose City Councilwoman
 Sam Liccardo, San Jose City Councilman
 Madison Nguyen, San Jose City Councilwoman and Vice Mayor of San Jose
 Pierluigi Oliverio, San Jose City Councilman
 Mark Pham
 Tyrone Wade

Withdrew
 Pete Constant, San Jose City Councilman
 Andrew Abe Diaz, perennial candidate
 Louis Garza
 Susan Marsland (running for San Jose City Council)
 Larry Rouse
 David Wall, candidate for Santa Clara County Supervisor in 2013 and for San Jose City Council in 1998
 David Warner, candidate for San Jose City Council in 2004

Declined
 Pat Waite, businessman and candidate for San Jose City Council in 2008
 Forrest Williams, former San Jose City Councilman and candidate for Santa Clara County Supervisor in 2010

Primary election
The primary election saw a total of ten candidates on the ballot, including Dave Cortese, a Santa Clara County Supervisor and former San Jose City Councilmember, as well as four sitting San Jose City Councilmembers: Vice Mayor Madison Nguyen, Sam Liccardo, Pierluigi Oliverio, and Rose Herrera.

The political climate of the race was influenced by an ongoing dispute between representatives of the City's labor force and Mayor Chuck Reed, stemming from a 2012 ballot initiative championed by Reed to restructure San Jose City employee pensions. Dave Cortese received the full endorsement and support of the politically powerful South Bay Labor Council, while the four sitting Councilmembers, having supported Mayor Reed's pension reform initiative, were described as "Reed loyalists." This ideological polarization was present not just in San Jose's mayoral election, but in a number of City Council races as well.

As part of his campaign, Councilmember Liccardo authored a book in which he assessed the issues facing San Jose and offered his own vision for the City. On May 2, the Editorial Board of the San Jose Mercury News endorsed Liccardo for Mayor, citing the book as well as his record on the Council.

Polling

Results

Runoff election

Polling

Results

References

2014 California elections
2014 United States mayoral elections
June 2014 events in the United States
2014